Claudio Bellini (born May 3, 1963) is an Italian-born architect and designer based in Milan. He runs an architecture and design practice, CLAUDIO BELLINI. An international speaker with many years of university teaching experience, Bellini also works as the creative director for a number of global brands.

Biography
Born and raised in Milan, Bellini's strong fascination with creativity dates back to his early childhood years, growing up with his father, Mario Bellini, who is a pioneer in contemporary design. In 1990, Bellini graduated from the Politecnico di Milano where he received a degree in architecture and Industrial Design. Immediately after his studies, he started to work with his father in Mario Bellini Associates where he took part in research projects in the fields of industrial, architectural and furniture design.

Besides, he has also worked with a number companies for product design (Barazzoni - VitrA), automotive (Fiat Automobiles) and home furniture (Walter Knoll - Pedrali - Natuzzi Italia).

Bellini has received a number of international design awards including the Red Dot and iF product design award. He has been also selected for the Compasso d'Oro (1998, 2000, 2001, 2004, 2005, 2006, and 2008). CB Design has also been selected by the Spanish magazine, El País as one of the ten most creative European design studios (Diez en diseno europeo, in El País Semanal (Spain), April 2007, pp. 22).

CLAUDIO BELLINI Studio 

Claudio Bellini founded his own design studio, CLAUDIO BELLINI, in 1996. The Milan-based studio is built on an open-minded and innovative perspective, respectful to design heritage, specializes in product, furniture, and interior design.

Home furniture design 

Another distinctive work of Claudio Bellini is the Liz Chair that is designed for German-based furniture producer Walter Knoll. The chair's silhouette is defined by swaying lines, whereas its delicate framework gives it stability. In 2013, the design has received the Red Dot Design Award.

Office furniture design 
Bellini has also made his mark in the office furniture industry. In his early career days, the TW Collection, an operative desk system designed for Frezza Spa in 1998 had gained traction in the industry.

Product design 
His product design works include collaborations with Barazzoni Spa in Italy, VitrA Bathroom in Turkey, and Cherry Terrace in Japan. His constant collaboration with Barazzoni Spa, an Italian company that specialized in the production of cookware, over the years had resulted in more than 20 products. Launched in 2003, My Lady is a range of non-stick aluminium pots.

Achievements & awards

References

External links
 

Architects from Milan
Living people
Italian industrial designers
Italian furniture designers
1963 births